Nepal Bureau of Standards & Metrology (NBSM) is a department under the Ministry of Industry, Nepal. The department was established in 1976 based on the Industrial policy (1974) with an aim to regulate and improve the quality of industrial production. The initial name of the department was Nepal Institute of Standards (NIS). In 1981, with the promulgation of the Nepal Standards (Certification Mark) Act 2037 and Rules 2040 were, it was renamed into Nepal Bureau of Standards (NBS). Later, in 1986 the metrology section was added. In 1988 Department of Weights and Measures of Ministry of Finance was also merged with Nepal Bureau of Standards and was restructured into Nepal Bureau of Standards and Metrology.

The Nepal Standard (Certification Mark) Act 2037 formed Nepal Council for Standards (NCS) as the governing body for Quality, Standards, Testing and Metrology (QSTM) activities in Nepal. The NBSM  acts as the secretariat to this council.

Publications
NBSM develops national standards and also to formulate concerning acts and rules. The standards are formulated following international practices.  Majority of the standards published by  NBSM  are voluntary standards, however, it could be mandatory to those who apply and comply with the provisions as laid down in Nepal Standards.

It has established national specification for more than 600 industrial items.

See List of Nepal Standards.

Regional Office
Nepal Bureau of Standards and Metrology(NBSM) has eleven regional offices for implementation of Standard Measure and Weight Act 2025 and rules 2027, and Prepackages Rules, 2077.

Standard and Metrology Office, Jhapa 
Standard and Metrology Office, Biratnagar
Standard and Metrology Office, Janakpur
Standard and Metrology Office, Birgunj
Standard and Metrology Office, Kathmandu
Standard and Metrology Office, Pokhara
Standard and Metrology Office, Butwal
Standard and Metrology Office, Nepalgunj
Standard and Metrology Office, Birendranagar
Standard and Metrology Office, Dhangadhi
Standard and Metrology Office, Silgadhi

Departments
NBSM has the following departments:
 Departmental Head
 Certification Department
 Quality control and Laboratory Department
 Scientific Metrology Department

Noticeable works
 In January 2019, the licence of 18 construction material manufacturing companies were suspended for producing substandard goods. These were including Ghirahi Cement Pvt Ltd in Dang, Narayani Micropipe Industry Pvt Ltd in Bara, Nawa Nepal Plastic Industry, Narayani Cement Industry Pvt Ltd in Bara, Mega Cement Pvt Ltd in Jhapa, Laxmi Steels Pvt Ltd in Nawalparasi, Kathmandu Steels Pvt Ltd in Nawalparasi and Ganapati Vanaspati Pvt Ltd in Bara, International Cement Pvt Ltd in Birgunj, Gorakhkali Cement Industries Pvt Ltd in Jhapa, Annapurna Cement Pvt Ltd in Morang, Golden Battery Pvt Ltd in Morang, Sugam Manufacture in Kathmandu, MJP Cement Pvt Ltd in Kapilvastu, Ganapati Cement Pvt Ltd in Kapilvastu, Hongsi Cement Industry in Nawalparasi, Arghakhanchi Cement Industry in Rupandehi and Shubha Shree Jagadamba Cement Industry in Bara.
In February 2020, 13 cement, iron and steel factories were investigated for cheating consumers by producing and selling substandard products.

Controversy and corruption
 NBSM was blamed for neglecting the standards of the gas plants construction.

External links
Homepage
List of Nepalese Standards

References

Government agencies of Nepal
Metrology organizations
Regulatory agencies of Nepal
1976 establishments in Nepal